Dolce Hotels and Resorts is a brand of independently owned hotels that targets business travelers. The brand touts easy navigation for meeting planners as well as other business clients. Wyndham acquired Dolce in 2015, and has been promoting the brand internationally. Dolce manages major, historic properties like Silverado Resort, California and Hayes Mansion. As of December 31, 2018, it has 20 properties with 4,024 rooms.

References

Wyndham brands
Hotels established in 1891